Hotten could refer to:

Hotten, a fictional town in the British soap opera Emmerdale
John Camden Hotten (1832–1873), Victorian pornographer, publisher, lexicographer
Jon Hotten (1965), English author and journalist.

See also
1732 Høtten, a 1998 Norwegian thriller film